Place de la Bourse is a square in Bordeaux, France and one of the city's most recognisable sights. Built from 1730 to 1775 along the river Garonne, it was a multi-building development designed by architect Ange-Jacques Gabriel. It is within the historic part of the city that has been recognized on the UNESCO World Heritage List as "an outstanding urban and architectural ensemble" of the 18th century.

History
In the original plan, a statue of King Louis XV of France was erected in the square. This statue was destroyed during the French Revolution. After the destruction of the statue, a Corinthian column-fountain was built on the square. Finally, in 1869 the sculpture Three Graces was installed in the same location.

Design of the surrounding buildings was finished by Ange-Jacques Gabriel in 1739; the project was issued for construction two weeks after the architect's death. After his death, his son was put in charge and finished the construction of the buildings.

Architecture 
This square is one of the most representative works of classical French architectural art of the eighteenth century. In the north stood the Palais de la Bourse (current Chamber of Commerce and Industry of Bordeaux) and in the south the Hotel des Fermes (now Interregional Directorate of Customs and Indirect Rights, which houses the National Museum of Customs). It was designed by Ange-Jacques Gabriel between 1735 and 1738. The sculptures represent Minerve protecting the arts and Mercury favoring the commerce of the city.

In 2007 it was included on the UNESCO World Heritage List as "an outstanding urban and architectural ensemble" of the 18th century.

References

Buildings and structures in Bordeaux
Tourist attractions in Bordeaux
Squares in France
Odonyms referring to a building